Tetraclonia is a genus of moths of the family Zygaenidae.

Species
 Tetraclonia cinniana (Druce, 1884)
 Tetraclonia dyaria Jordan, 1913
 Tetraclonia forreri (Druce, 1884)
 Tetraclonia latercula (H. Edwards, 1882)
 Tetraclonia saucia Jordan, 1913

References
 Tetraclonia at funet.fi

Procridinae
Zygaenidae genera